Evergreen, which includes Evergreen Estates, is a suburban residential neighbourhood in the southwest quadrant of Calgary, Alberta. It is located south of the Fish Creek Provincial Park, and southeast from the Tsuu T'ina first nation reserve.

There are two sections of Evergreen, the older and more established Evergreen Estates, and the newer Evergreen to the south. The two sections have separate community associations and street naming patterns. All streets with Evergreen in their name are members of the Shawnee-Evergreen Community Association along with the neighbouring community Shawnee Slopes, while those with different names are members of the Calgary Evergreen Community Association.

The area is represented in the Calgary City Council by the Ward 13 councillor.

The film Radiant City largely takes place in the community of Evergreen.

Demographics 
Updated demographics can be found on the City of Calgary website. www.calgary.ca
2016 census results. https://www.calgary.ca/CSPS/CNS/Pages/Social-research-policy-and-resources/Community-profiles/Evergreen.aspx

Residents in this community had a median household income of $105,640 in 2000, and there were 3.9% low income residents living in the neighbourhood. As of 2000, 18.2% of the residents were immigrants.  All buildings were single-family detached homes and 1.3% of the housing was used for renting.

Education 
The Calgary Board of Education opened the Evergreen Elementary School in 2009, which currently accommodates Kindergarten to Grade 5 students residing in Evergreen. Marshall Springs Middle School which currently accommodates Grade 6 to Grade 9 was opened in September 2017.  when Marshall Springs was built, it and Evergreen accommodated 4-9 and K-3 respectively, later changing to 5-9 and K-4, and currently is 6-9 and K-5. 

Dr Freda Miller School, which currently accommodates K-5, opened for the 2020-2021 school year.

The Calgary Catholic School District opened the Our Lady of the Evergreens School. This is an elementary school that has grades K-6.

See also 
List of neighbourhoods in Calgary

References

External links 
Calgary Evergreen Community Association
Shawnee-Evergreen Community Association

Neighbourhoods in Calgary